Solomon Jones III (born July 16, 1984) is an American former professional basketball player. He is 6'10" and weighs 235 lb, playing the power forward and center positions. He played his college basketball at Daytona State College for two seasons (2002–2004) and then at the University of South Florida for another two seasons (2004–2006). He was then selected by the Atlanta Hawks with the 33rd overall pick in the 2006 NBA draft.

Professional career
As a rookie, he played in 58 games for the Atlanta Hawks. He averaged 3.3 points a game and 2.3 rebounds a game in 11.5 minutes. After three seasons with the Atlanta Hawks, he signed a two-year deal with the Indiana Pacers.

On January 3, 2012, he signed with the Los Angeles Clippers, but he was later waived on February 7. On February 15, 2012, he signed a 10-day contract with the New Orleans Hornets. On February 27, 2012, he signed a second 10-day contract with the Hornets. In September 2012, Jones signed with the Phoenix Suns. On October 24, 2012, Jones was waived by the Suns. In January 2013, he joined the Liaoning Flying Leopards of the Chinese Basketball Association. On April 12, 2013, Jones signed with the New York Knicks. He was later waived by the Knicks on April 15, 2013.

In September 2013, he signed with the Orlando Magic. On January 4, 2014, he was waived by the Magic.

On February 10, 2014, Jones was acquired by the Erie BayHawks of the NBA D-League. On May 8, 2014, he signed with Changsha Bank Guangdong (a.k.a. Dongguan Snowwolf) of the Chinese National Basketball League.

On September 26, 2015, Jones signed with the Chicago Bulls. However, he was later waived by the Bulls on October 18, 2015. On March 24, 2017, Jones was acquired by the Oklahoma City Blue.

Jones joined Mexican team Tijuana Zonkeys in 2020. His stint was short-lived, as the rest of the season was cancelled due to the COVID-19 pandemic, though he returned to the team for the 2022 season.

The Basketball Tournament
In 2017, Jonesparticipated in The Basketball Tournament with Tampa Bulls, a team of USF alumni. Jones' team made it to the Sweet 16 where they lost to eventual tournament champion Overseas Elite.

NBA career statistics

Regular season

|-
| align="left" | 
| align="left" | Atlanta
| 58 || 8 || 11.5 || .508 || .000 || .787 || 2.3 || .2 || .2 || .7 || 3.3
|-
| align="left" | 
| align="left" | Atlanta
| 35 || 0 || 4.1 || .400 || .000 || .550 || 1.2 || .0 || .1 || .1 || 1.0
|-
| align="left" | 
| align="left" | Atlanta
| 63 || 0 || 10.7 || .604 || .500 || .716 || 2.3 || .2 || .1 || .5 || 3.0
|-
| align="left" | 
| align="left" | Indiana
| 52 || 2 || 13.0 || .443 || .000 || .718 || 2.8 || .6 || .3 || .7 || 4.0
|-
| align="left" | 
| align="left" | Indiana
| 39 || 0 || 13.5 || .405 || .000 || .661 || 2.9 || .8 || .3 || .6 || 3.6
|-
| align="left" | 
| align="left" | L.A. Clippers
| 10 || 0 || 9.6 || .125 || .000 || .800 || 1.7 || .2 || .4 || .5 || .6
|-
| align="left" | 
| align="left" | New Orleans
| 11 || 1 || 17.8 || .434 || .000 || .833 || 3.7 || .6 || .5 || .5 || 5.5
|-
| align="left" | 
| align="left" | New York
| 2 || 1 || 13.0 || .000 || .000 || .000 || 1.5 || .0 || .0 || .5 || .0
|-
| align="left" | 
| align="left" | Orlando
| 11 || 0 || 7.7 || .353 || .000 || .500 || 1.5 || .2 || .2 || .2 || 1.3
|- class="sortbottom"
| style="text-align:center;" colspan="2"| Career
| 281 || 12 || 11.9 || .467 || .111 || .717 || 2.3 || .4 || .2 || .5 || 3.0

Playoffs

|-
| align="left" | 2008
| align="left" | Atlanta
| 7 || 0 || 4.1 || .200 || .000 || .000 || 1.1 || .1 || .1 || .4 || .6
|-
| align="left" | 2009
| align="left" | Atlanta
| 9 || 1 || 8.6 || .500 || .000 || 1.000 || 1.8 || .2 || .1 || .0 || 1.6
|- class="sortbottom"
| style="text-align:center;" colspan="2"| Career
| 16 || 1 || 6.6 || .364 || .000 || .500 || 1.5 || .2 || .1 || .2 || 1.1

References

External links

1984 births
Living people
African-American basketball players
American expatriate basketball people in China
American expatriate basketball people in Malaysia
American expatriate basketball people in Mexico
American expatriate basketball people in the Dominican Republic
American men's basketball players
Atlanta Hawks draft picks
Atlanta Hawks players
Basketball players from Florida
Big3 players
Centers (basketball)
Daytona State Falcons men's basketball players
Indiana Pacers players
Kuala Lumpur Dragons players
Liaoning Flying Leopards players
Los Angeles Clippers players
New Orleans Hornets players
New York Knicks players
Oklahoma City Blue players
Orlando Magic players
People from Eustis, Florida
Power forwards (basketball)
South Florida Bulls men's basketball players
Sportspeople from Lake County, Florida
Tijuana Zonkeys players
21st-century African-American sportspeople
20th-century African-American people
American men's 3x3 basketball players